Guatemala is competing at the 2013 World Aquatics Championships in Barcelona, Spain between 19 July and 4 August 2013.

Open water swimming

Guatemala qualified four quota places for the following events in open water swimming.

Swimming

Guatemalan swimmers achieved qualifying standards in the following events (up to a maximum of 2 swimmers in each event at the A-standard entry time, and 1 at the B-standard):

Men

Women

References

External links
Barcelona 2013 Official Site
Federacíon Guatemaltecá de Natacíon web site

Nations at the 2013 World Aquatics Championships
2013 in Guatemalan sport
Guatemala at the World Aquatics Championships